The mass media in Paraguay includes radio, television, newspapers, and the internet. As in many South American countries, radio is an important disseminator of information in Paraguay. More than 70 commercial and community radio stations broadcast daily across the nation. Paraguay also has four television stations and, as of 2004, about 750,000 households with televisions. The country has six major daily newspapers: 1870 Digital, ABC Color, Diario Noticias, Última Hora, La Nación, and Diario Popular. The newspapers have a combined circulation of about 150,000 copies daily.

Freedom of the press 
The free practice of journalism is guaranteed under the Paraguay Constitution and national laws. Constitutional guarantees for freedoms of expression and of the press are unevenly upheld. Corrupt authorities and criminal organizations exert pressure on journalists and occasionally subject them to deadly attacks.

See also
Communications in Paraguay

References

Further reading

External links
Abc
1870 Digital
La Nacion

 
Paraguay
Paraguay